The Autoramas are a Brazilian surf/garage rock/garage punk/rockabilly band that started in the late 90s and continue playing to this day.

History 
The Autoramas was formed by Gabriel Thomaz (guitar and vocals) that, after becoming known with its group Little Quail and The Mad Birds and to make success like composer of bands like Raimundos and Ultraje a Rigor, changes to Rio de Janeiro and invites his friends Nervoso Drums and Simone  to make a sound baptized in Portuguese as "Rock to Dance", a mixture of the surfers of the 60's with the New Wave of the 1980s, more influences of rockabilly, Jovem Guarda and the energy of punk rock, with guitars with timbre s striking, bass distorted and Beat dancing.

In 1998 the drummer Bacalhau enters into the place of Nervoso, and the group makes its first presentation live. In 2000 comes out the first CD,  Stress, Depressão & Síndrome do Pânico , produced by Carlo Bartolini and released by the independent label Astronauta Discos Music. From this CD came songs like "Fale Mal de Mim" and "Carinha Triste", broadcast by the entire Brasil radio and MTV, performing a tour that went from Rio Grande do Sul to Amapá in more than 80 concerts, including a presentation in Rock In Rio III.]

His second album,  [Vida REal] , was released at the end of 2001. After a new tour by Brazil playing in eleven, they depart for their first international tour in Japan, along with the local band Guitar Wolf, passing through five cities Japanese. Also released is a collection of the Autoramas for the Japanese market, called "Full Speed Ahead". The year 2003 marked the release of the third Album,  [Nada Pode Parar Os Autoramas] , by the independent record label Monster Records. This album won the London Burning Award for Independent Music in the categories "Best Band" and "Best Disco" of 2003, and won invitations to the main festivals in Brazil.

In 2004 the Autoramas leaves for its second international tour, in the Argentina and Uruguay playing in three cities, Montevideo, Buenos Aires and Rosario , followed by the third international tour, with four shows in Chile and Argentina, already with the participation of the new bass player, Selma Vieira. With the tour the Autoramas reaches the mark of 96 presentations that year, including shows in 21 Brazilian states. Also finalized is the song "Você Sabe", still from the CD  Nada Pode Parar Os Autoramas , that gains high rotation in the MTV and wins three prizes in the VMB of 2005.

In May 2007, after tour by the Europe, the band launches its fourth CD, "Teletransporte", by the record label Mondo 77. Selma leaves the group in 2008, being replaced by Flávia Couri. At the end of 2009 is released the CD and DVD  MTV Apresenta Autoramas Desplugado . With this, the band becomes the unique one to produce an acoustic of the series "MTV Aprenseta".

In June 2011, the Autoramas began a system of collective financing to raise funds and finalize the recordings of his new studio album,  [Música Crocante] . A arrecadação foi bem-sucedida, e o trabalho foi lançado em outubro do mesmo ano.

In 2013, the Autoramas joined BNegão to record the EP  Auto Boogie . With production of Frejat, the recording was released in digital format at the beginning of September, with the "physical" version released only on vinyl. O EP foi uma prévia da parceria dos músicos em sua participação no festival Rock In Rio, realizada no dia 14 daquele mês.

In November of the same year the group released the DVD  Autoramas Internacional , also produced through collective financing. Recorded as a documentary, it features amateur recordings of the Autoramas touring in countries such as Germany, Spain, England and Chile, among others, interspersed by video clips from their most recent albums <

At the beginning of 2015, the Autoramas announces a new formation, that joins to the members: Melvin (bass), Fred Castro (ex-drummer of Raimundos) and Érika Martins (ex-Penelope) on guitar, percussion, keyboards and voice.

In October 2016 change of drummer, leaves Fred Castro for entrance of Fábio Lima and depart for the fourteenth European tour with Jairo Fajersztajn in the Bass.

The band performances in Germany, Austria and Portugal, where they recorded a program for the RTP Channel 3.No Ar

The single "Quando A Polícia Chegar" stayed for 5 months among the Top 30 on Radio Antena3 in Portugal, its best position was seventh position.
In Brazil the single Quando a Polícia Chegar reached first position in the main rock radios of the country.

The single "Verão" has been in the Portuguese charts for 6 months, its best position was second place.

In 2017 they did another international tour through SXSW in the US and Mexico.

Their album Libido was ranked as the 13th best Brazilian album of 2018 by the Brazilian edition of Rolling Stone magazine and among the 25 best Brazilian albums of the second half of 2018 by the São Paulo Association of Art Critics.

Discography

Albums
 2000 – Stress, Depressão & Síndrome do Pânico
 2001 – Vida Real
 2003 – Nada Pode Parar Os Autoramas
 2007 – Teletransporte
 2009 – MTV Apresenta Autoramas Desplugado
 2011 – Música Crocante
 2016 – O Futuro Dos Autoramas
 2018 – Libido
 2020 – B-Sides & Extras Vol. 1
 2021 – B-Sides & Extras Vol. 2
 2022 – Autointitulado

7 Inch
 1999 – Motocross/Bahamas - Monstro Discos
 2002 – HxCxlx - Monstro Discos
 2008 – Catchy Chorus/Paciência - Gravadora Discos
 2010 – Couldn´t Care At All/Samba-Rock Do Bacalhau - Gravadora Discos
 2017 – Jet To The Jungle/Demais - Hearts Bleed Blue 
 2017 – Autoramas/Mundo Alto - Hearts Bleed Blue

Compilations
 2001 – Full Speed Ahead (released only in Japan)
 2005 – RRRRRRRROCK
 2007 – Mucho Gusto (released only in Argentina)
 2015 – Unsere Favoriten (released only in Germany)

DVDs 
 2009 – MTV Apresenta: Autoramas Desplugado
 2013 – Autoramas Internacional

References

External links

 Autoramas Discography, Discogs.com.

Musical groups established in 1997
Brazilian alternative rock groups
1997 establishments in Brazil